The Tjungundji or Tjongkandji are an Indigenous Australian people of central and western Cape York Peninsula in northern Queensland.

Country

Alternative names
 Tjungundji/ Tyongandyi/ Chongandji/ Tjongangi/ Tjungundji/
 Joonkoonjee/Joongoonjie
 Chunkunji/ Chinganji/
 Ngucrand (perhaps a horde).

Notes and references

Explanatory notes

Notes

References

Aboriginal peoples of Queensland